Medvezhyegorsky (masculine), Medvezhyegorskaya (feminine), or Medvezhyegorskoye (neuter) may refer to:
Medvezhyegorsky District, a district of the Republic of Karelia, Russia
Medvezhyegorskoye Urban Settlement, a municipal formation which the town of Medvezhyegorsk and three rural localities in Medvezhyegorsky District of the Republic of Karelia, Russia are incorporated as